Richard Bowie Spikes (October 2, 1878 – January 22, 1963) was an African-American inventor. The holder of a number of United States patents, his improvements on existing inventions include a beer tap, automobile directional signals, an automatic gear shift device based on automatic transmission for automobiles and other motor vehicles and a safety braking system for trucks and buses.

Life
Richard B. Spikes was born in San Francisco, California and the fifth of nine children of Monroe Spikes, a barber, and his wife Medora (Kirby) Spikes. Two of his younger brothers, John Curry Spikes (1881–1955) and Reb Spikes (1888–1982), were musicians and songwriters (Someday Sweetheart, a jazz standard [1919] was their biggest hit). Reb Spikes was a noted jazz saxophonist who worked with Jelly Roll Morton, Kid Ory and Sid Le Protti; among the well known jazzmen he gave a start to were Lionel Hampton and Les Hite.

Although a capable musician—piano and violin—Richard Spikes learned to cut hair in his father's barber shop, and then became a public school teacher in Beaumont, Texas. On October 8, 1900, he married Lula Belle Charlton (1880–1970), daughter of Charles Napoleon Charlton, an ex-slave who co-founded the first public schools for African Americans in the city of Beaumont. Richard and Lula had one son, Richard Don Quixote Spikes (1902–1989).

Soon after his marriage, the elder Spikes moved west to Albuquerque, New Mexico and later Bisbee, Arizona where he operated a barber shop and later a saloon. He became dissatisfied with how draft beer was dispensed from a keg; and developed variations on the pressure-dispense beer tap. The patent was purchased by the Milwaukee Brewing Company and variations of the invention are still in use.

Moving to San Francisco, California, Richard Spikes eventually received a patent pertaining to automobile directional signals, which he installed on a Pierce-Arrow car in 1913. However, contrary to many sources, Spikes was not the original inventor of this pivotal device, as Percy Douglas-Hamilton was awarded  in 1906 for his creation of the first directional signals, six years before Spikes developed his version of the device. While he was working on his brake testing machine a few years later, the Oakland, California Police Department was interested enough to give it a tryout.

Spikes continued working as a barber, owning and operating shops in San Francisco, Fresno, California and Stockton, California until his eyesight began to fade due to the effects of glaucoma which affected other members of his family, including his brother John, who received a patent for a "writing aid for the blind"—a paper holder, essentially a pad with a clip affixed to it in order to secure sheets of writing paper. Richard Spikes also kept working; in December 1932, Spikes received a patent for an automatic gear shift device based on automatic transmission for automobiles and other motor vehicles invented in 1904 by the Sturtevant brothers of Boston, Massachusetts.

Inventions 
Richard Spikes patented or developed the following inventions:
 , Beer Tapper (1908)
 , Billiard Cue Rack (1910)
 ,  Continuous contact trolley pole (1919)
  Brake Testing Machine (1923)
  Pantograph (1923)
  Combination Milk Bottle Opener and Cover (1926)
  Methods and Apparatus of Obtaining Average Samples and Temperature of Tank Liquids (1932)
  Modifications to the automatic gear shift (1932)
  Transmission and shifting thereof (1933)
  Horizontally Swinging Barber's Chair (1950)
  Automatic Safety Brake System (1962)

References 

Engineers from California
1878 births
1965 deaths
African-American inventors
20th-century American inventors
People from Beaumont, Texas
People from Dallas
People from Bisbee, Arizona
People from Stockton, California
20th-century African-American people